John O'Brian  is an art historian, writer, and curator. He is best known for his books on modern art, including Clement Greenberg: The Collected Essays and Criticism, one of The New York Times “Notable Books of the Year” in 1986, and for his exhibitions on nuclear photography such as Camera Atomica, organized for the Art Gallery of Ontario in 2015. Camera Atomica was the first comprehensive exhibition on postwar nuclear photography. From 1987-2017 he taught at the University of British Columbia, Vancouver, where he held the Brenda & David McLean Chair in Canadian Studies (2008-11) and was an associate of the Peter Wall Institute for Advanced Studies. O’Brian has been a critic of neoconservative policies since the start of the Culture Wars in the 1980s. He is a recipient of the Thakore Award in Human Rights and Peace Studies from Simon Fraser University.

Early life and education

O'Brian was born in 1944 to Canadian parents in Bath, England. His father was a career officer in the Royal Air Force. His only sibling, Peter, is a filmmaker and producer. In 1969 he married Helen Worts, with whom he has three children: Melanie O’Brian, Amy O’Brian Wang, and Meghan O’Brian Braunstein. He also has four grandchildren. He was educated at New Park School in St. Andrews, Fife, and Trinity College School in Port Hope, Ontario, before entering Trinity College at the University of Toronto, where he received an Honours B.A. in Political Science and Economics in 1966. At university, he played Varsity rugby.

He worked at the Toronto firm of Harris & Partners until 1974, before enrolling at York University to study art and literature. There, he began to publish art criticism,  poetry, and art history. He received his PhD in art history from Harvard University under the supervision of T.J. Clark. While at Harvard, he was a research associate at the Fogg Art Museum and a proponent of “social art history,” an approach that investigates social as well as aesthetic issues. “I’m interested in how art gets produced and looked at under the social arrangements of capitalism,” he stated in an interview. His work has sometimes been targeted by neoconservative critics for mixing art and politics. O’Brian was also a member of the Pumping Station collective, a group of radical thinkers that met at the house of Gillian and Iain Boal, during the first half of the 1980s.

Teaching and lectures

O’Brian has taught at York University, Toronto, Harvard University, Cambridge, The University of British Columbia, Vancouver, and Ritsumeikan University, Kyoto. At the University of British Columbia, he was appointed assistant professor in 1987, associate professor in 1991, and full professor in 1998. He chaired the University Art Committee from 1993-2014 and the Program in Canadian Studies from 2002-05. He also held the Brenda & David McLean Chair in Canadian Studies from 2008-11 and was an associate of the Peter Wall Institute for Advanced Studies. He taught undergraduate and graduate courses, in addition to supervising MA and Ph.D. theses. He also organized numerous field trips for students. Following the election of Donald Trump as president of the United States in 2016, he canceled a field trip to New York because, he said, “worms are crawling out of the ground all over America [and I will] not crawl with them.” Students circulated a petition denouncing the cancellation.

He has lectured across North America as well as in Europe, Australia, China, India, Israel, Japan, Mexico, Palestine, and South Africa. He was the Shastri Indo-Canadian Institute Visiting Lecturer in India in 1996-97 and visiting research professor at Ritsumeikan University in Japan in 2007.

Museums and galleries 
O'Brian has been professionally involved with museums and galleries as a curator, exhibitor, researcher, advisor, and board member. From 1989-1991, he was a member of the board of the Vancouver Art Gallery, and from 1991-98 a special advisor to the board of the National Gallery of Canada, In 2020 was appointed an external advisor to the National Gallery. He has also been involved with the Harvard University Art Museum, Polygon Gallery, and the Morris and Helen Belkin Art Gallery. 

He maintains an occasional art practice. His work has been exhibited at public and private galleries: Octozilla (2018), produced with Gregory Coyes, was shown at the Vancouver Art Gallery; Ci elegans (2017), produced with Marina Roy, at SFU Galleries, Vancouver; Sixteen Nuclear Power Stations (2013) at the Art Gallery of Ontario, Toronto; Multiplication (1998) at the Catriona Jeffries Gallery, Vancouver; and More Los Angeles Apartments (1998) at Gagosian Gallery in New York and Los Angeles. “More Los Angeles Apartments unfolds as a peripatetic meditation on Edward Ruscha’s photobooks, personally placing O’Brian in geographical and conceptual proximity to Ruscha’s earlier work.”

Publications

O'Brian is the author or editor of twenty books and many articles. Some have been translated into French, German, Spanish, Italian, Portuguese, or Japanese. Approximately half his publications focus on Canadian art and culture.  His first book, David Milne and the Modern Tradition of Painting, published in 1983, is the first in-depth study of the artist. His most recent book, The Bomb in the Wilderness: Photography and the Nuclear Era in Canada, published in 2020, is the first substantial examination on what photography reveals about the size and shape of Canada’s nuclear footprint.

The Bomb in the Wilderness: Photography and the Nuclear Era in Canada 
The Bomb in the Wilderness contends that photography is one of the primary ways, if not the primary way, nuclear activities are interpreted and remembered. The book asks: Do photographs alert viewers to nuclear threat, numb them to its dangers, or do both at the same time? O’Brian argues that the impact and global reach of Canada’s nuclear programs have been felt ever since the bombing of Hiroshima and Nagasaki in 1945. The book has been referred to as a “foundational text.”  Douglas Coupland writes, “It finds beauty in grotesque places [and] validates the reader’s Cold War paranoia.”

Camera Atomica 
Guest curated by O'Brian for the Art Gallery of Ontario in 2015, Camera Atomica was "the first substantial exhibition of nuclear photography to encompass the entire postwar period from the bombings of Hiroshima in 1945 to the triple meltdown at Fukushima Daiichi in 2011." The exhibition included over 200 works ranging from photographs taken by the United States government of atomic bomb tests to images of anti-nuclear protests on the streets of Toronto, to images by artists, to photos of the utilization of nuclear technology in medicine. In addition to addressing key issues in the nuclear era, Camera Atomica aimed to make visible the interconnections between nuclear technology and the photographic medium. One critic concluded that going to the show was “a civic duty.” Peter Galison wrote that "this remarkable show and catalogue promise to make clear that the age of the nucleus is also and always an age of the image."

Ruthless Hedonism: The American Reception of Matisse 
Matisse was an emblematic figure in twentieth-century art, perhaps the emblem of an artist whose work is predicated on the sensual pleasures of looking. This study investigates how the artist and his work were received in America until his death in 1954. To promote his work, Matisse tried to show the media that whatever his reputation as an avant-gardist the conduct of his life was solidly bourgeois. He collaborated closely with museums exhibiting his work, cultivated private collectors, and played off dealers against each other. The book “casts a great deal of light on the way in which a picture becomes valuable… Patronage is as much a romance as a business transaction.”

Clement Greenberg: The Collected Essays and Criticism 
The four volumes of Clement Greenberg: The Collected Essays and Criticism have generated international interest and debate. The first two volumes appeared in 1986, the second two in 1993. In an editorial written for The New Criterion, Hilton Kramer expressed admiration for Greenberg's criticism but distaste for O'Brian's politicization of it. Following a 2009 symposium at Harvard University on Greenberg, Jeff Nguyen wrote: “The symposium kicked off with a roundtable discussion featuring experts on Greenberg’s art criticism: Yve-Alain Bois (heavyweight in 20th century European and American art), Thierry de Duve (specialist in the metaphysics of art, made Duchamp difficult), Serge Guilbaut (specialist in art and politics during the Cold War), Rosalind Krauss (foremost champion of Greenberg, turned defector), John O’Brian (editor of the Collected Essays and Criticism). Benjamin Buchloch was the moderator. Holy Critics! How many more rock stars can you cram into a room? The only person missing from this esteemed company was Michael Fried. The University of British Columbia (Serge Guilbaut and John O’Brian) appears to be a happening place for art history.”

Research and Archives

Until the early 2000s, O’Brian’s research focused on modern art history and criticism, primarily in North America. Since then, it has concentrated on nuclear photography in North America and Japan. His archives include photographs, study notes, correspondence, interviews, journal reviews, and press clippings. Notable collections within the archives include correspondence with Clement Greenberg from 1981-1993 and atomic photographs (military, press, and vernacular), artworks, protest leaflets, propaganda pamphlets, corporate reports, government bulletins, newspaper front pages, and postcards. The archives are promised to the National Gallery of Canada.

Awards and recognition 

 Universities Art Association of Canada Lifetime Achievement Award, 2020
 Sports Hall of Fame, University of Toronto, 2016
 Thakore Award in Human Rights and Peace Studies, Simon Fraser University, 2011
 Honorary Doctorate from Trinity College at the University of Toronto, 2011    
 Fellow of the Royal Society of Canada, 2009
 Brenda & David McLean Chair in Canadian Studies, University of British Columbia, 2008-2011
 Visiting Research Professor, Ritsumeikan University, Kyoto, 2007
 Killam Research Prize, University of British Columbia, 2000
 Shastri Indo-Canadian Institute Visiting Lectureship, India, 1996-1997
 Senior Research Fellowship, Canadian Centre for the Visual Arts, Ottawa, 1992-93
 Janet Braide Award for outstanding scholarship in Canadian art history, 1990

Recent Exhibitions Organized 

Bombhead, Vancouver Art Gallery, Vancouver, March–June 2018. Curator.
 The Nuclear Machine, Danish Institute for International Studies, Copenhagen, May-June 2016. Co-curator. 
Camera Atomica, Art Gallery of Ontario, Toronto, July–November 2015. Curator.
After the Flash, WORK Gallery, London (UK), October–December 2014. Co-curator.
Strangelove's Weegee, Presentation House Art Gallery, North Vancouver, June–July 2013. Curator.

Selected publications

Books and Exhibition Catalogues

 David Milne and the Modern Tradition of Painting. Toronto: Coach House Press, 1983.
 Degas to Matisse: The Maurice Wertheim Collection. New York and Cambridge, Mass.: Harry N. Abrams and Harvard University Art Museums, 1988.
 Clement Greenberg: The Collected Essays and Criticism. 4 vols. Chicago: University of Chicago Press, 1986 and 1993.
 The Flat Side of the Landscape: The Emma Lake Artists' Workshops. Saskatoon: Mendel Art Gallery, 1989.
 Voices of Fire: Art, Rage, Power, and the State.  Co-edited with Bruce Barber and Serge Guilbaut.  Toronto: University of Toronto Press, 1996.
 Ruthless Hedonism: The American Reception of Matisse. Chicago: University of Chicago Press, 1999.
 All Amazed: For Roy Kiyooka. Co-edited with Naomi Sawada and Scott Watson. Vancouver: Arsenal Pulp Press, 2002.
 Greenberg Variations. Portland, Oregon: The Back Room, 2007.
 Beyond Wilderness: The Group of Seven, Canadian Identity and Contemporary Art. Co-edited with Peter White. Montreal: McGill Queen's University Press, 2007.
 Atomic Postcards: Radioactive Messages from the Cold War. Co-written with Jeremy Borsos. Bristol, UK: Intellect Books, 2011.
 Strangelove's Weegee. Vancouver: Presentation House Gallery, 2013.
 Camera Atomica. Editor. London and Toronto: Black Dog Publishing and the Art Gallery of Ontario, 2015.
 Breathless Days, 1959–1960. Co-edited with Serge Guilbaut. Durham, N.C.: Duke University Press. 2017.
 The Bomb in the Wilderness: Photography and the Nuclear Era in Canada. Vancouver: UBC Press, 2020.
 Through Post-Atomic Eyes. Co-edited with Claudette Lauzon. Montreal: McGill-Queen’s University Press, 2020.

Articles

“Dead West: Mark Ruwedel and Sacrifice Zones,” Deutsche Borse Photography Prize (London: The Photographers Gallery, 2019), 118-119.
“Motive for Metaphor,” David Milne: Modern Painting (London: Dulwich Picture Gallery, 2018), 161-163.
“Clement Greenberg,” co-authored with Jessica Law and Jeff O’Brien, Oxford Bibliographies in Art History, 2016, www.oxfordbibliographies.com.
"Landscape as Fordscape," in Picturing the Americas: Landscape Painting from Tierra del Fuego to the Arctic (Toronto and São Paulo: Art Gallery of Ontario and Pinacoteca do Estado de São Paulo/Yale University Press, 2015), 188–93. (Project)
"The Bomb, the Group of Seven, and Douglas Coupland's G7 Series," in Douglas Coupland: Everywhere Is Anywhere Is Anything Is Everything (Vancouver and London: Vancouver Art Gallery and Black Dog, 2014), 69–71.
"Morrice and Matisse: Bedfellows Under the Sign of Modernism," Morrice and Lyman in the Company of Matisse (Quebec: Musée National des Beaux-Arts du Québec, 2014), 113–135.
"Sur le plateau de Docteur Folamour," in Errances Photographiques: Mobilité, Intermédialité, edited by Suzanne Paquet (Montreal: Presses de L‘Université de Montréal, 2014), 185–200.
"On Photographing a Dirty Bomb," in The Cultural Work of Photography in Canada, edited by Carol Payne and Andrea Kunnard (Montreal: McGill-Queen's University Press, 2011), 182–94.
"Ishiuchi Miyako Interviewed by John O'Brian," in Hiroshima by Ishiuchi Miyako (Vancouver; UBC Museum of Anthropology, 2011).
"Postcard to Moscow," in Postcards: Ephemeral Histories of Modernity, edited by Jordana Mendelson and David Proschaska (Philadelphia: Pennsylvania State University Press, 2010), 182–93, 222–24.
"Amerika Dropt a Bomb on Nevada," Open Letter: A Canadian Journal of Writing and Theory 14, No. 4 (Fall 2010), 63–77.
"Another Report on the Age of Extinction," Canadian Review of American Studies 38, No.1 (2008), 191–98.
"The Nuclear Family of Man," Japan Focus: Asia Pacific Journal, July 2008. http://japanfocus.org/ (Re-published on The History News Network)
"Bernard Smith's Early Marxist Art History," Thesis Eleven (Australia), No. 82 (August 2005), 29–37.
"Anthem Lip-Sync," The Journal of Canadian Art History XXI/1 & 2 (2000), pp. 140–151.
"Shining on the Modernist Parade: The American Sacralization of Matisse at the Philadelphia Museum of Art in 1948," Coloquio Internacional de Historia del Arte (Mexico City) 20, 1997, pp. 771–805.

References 

Canadian art historians
Canadian male non-fiction writers
Academic staff of the University of British Columbia
Living people
Harvard University alumni
1944 births
Trinity College (Canada) alumni
York University alumni